Yurt ve Dünya (Turkish: Homeland and the World) was a sociological and political magazine which was headquartered first in Ankara and then in Istanbul, Turkey. It was first published in the period between 1941 and 1944 and then between 1977 and 1980. It is known for its well-known editors and contributors, including Sabahattin Ali, Niyazi Berkes, Behice Boran and Pertev Naili Boratav.

History and profile
Yurt ve Dünya was started as a monthly in Ankara in 1941. Its directors included Adnan Cemgil, Pertev Naili Boratav and Behice Boran. The magazine focused on sociological analyses of the rural society following the views of Turkish sociologist Ziya Gökalp and French sociologist Pierre Guillaume Frédéric le Play. One of the contributors to articles about rural sociology was Mediha Esenel. Total number of the contributors of Yurt ve Dünya in the first period was nearly sixty-seven. It also featured poems and short stories. The magazine was banned by the Turkish authorities in 1944 without any legal process due to its alleged leftist leaning. It produced a total of forty-two issues during its lifetime.

In 1977 Yurt ve Dünya was restarted in Istanbul under the ownership of Behice Boran and was affiliated with Workers' Party of Turkey. It folded in March 1980 after producing 20 issues.

Some issues of the magazine are archived by TUSTAV.

References

1941 establishments in Turkey
1977 establishments in Turkey
1944 disestablishments in Turkey
1980 disestablishments in Turkey
Defunct political magazines published in Turkey
Magazines established in 1941
Magazines established in 1977
Magazines disestablished in 1944
Magazines disestablished in 1980
Magazines published in Ankara
Magazines published in Istanbul
Monthly magazines published in Turkey
Socialist magazines
Turkish-language magazines
Sociology journals
Censorship in Turkey
Banned magazines